Dan Levenson may refer to:
 Dan Levenson (musician), American old-time musician and storyteller
 Dan Levenson (artist), American artist

See also
 Dan Levinson, American jazz clarinetist, saxophonist, and bandleader